Stamm is a German surname; it may refer to:

 Barbara Stamm (1944–2022), German politician
 Cäcilia Cordula Stamm, birth name of Cäcilia Weber (1727–1793), mother of Constanze Weber, the wife of Wolfgang Amadeus Mozart
 Feliks Stamm (1901–1976), Polish boxing coach
 Hagen Stamm (born 1960), German water polo player
 John S. Stamm (1878–1956), American bishop of the Evangelical Church
 Marvin Stamm (born 1939), American bebop trumpeter
 Michael Stamm (born 1952), American backstroke swimmer
 Peter Stamm (born 1963), Swiss writer
 Robert Stamm (1900–1937), German politician
 Wilhelm von Stamm (died 1905), Latvian chess master

See also
 Stam (surname)
 

German-language surnames